Jost Amman (June 13, 1539 – March 17, 1591) was a Swiss-German artist, celebrated chiefly for his woodcuts, done mainly for book illustrations.

Early life 
Amman was born in Zürich, the son of a professor of Classics and Logic.  He was himself well-educated.  Little of his personal history is known beyond the fact that he moved to Nuremberg in 1560, where he took on citizenship and continued to reside until his death in March 1591. He worked initially with Virgil Solis, then a leading producer of book illustrations.

Career 
His productivity was very remarkable, as may be gathered from the statement of one of his pupils, who said that the drawings he made during a period of four years would have filled a hay wagon. A large number of his original drawings are in the Berlin print room. About 1,500 prints are attributed to him. He was one of the last major producers of woodcuts for books, as during his career engravings were gradually taking over that role. Although like most woodcut artists, he normally let a specialist formschneider cut the block to his drawing, he occasionally included both a cutter's knife and a quill pen in his signature on prints, suggesting he sometimes cut his own blocks.

Amman was the artist for Wenzel Jamnitzer's book Perspectiva corporum regularium (1568). A series of engravings by Amman of the kings of France, with short biographies, appeared in Frankfurt in 1576. He also executed many of the woodcut illustrations for the Bible published at Frankfurt by Sigismund Feierabend, and for a topographical survey of Bavaria by Philipp Apian. Another serial work, the Panoplia Omnium Liberalium Mechanicarum et Seden-tariarum Artium Genera Continens, containing 115 plates, is of great value. Amman's drawing is correct and spirited, and his delineation of the details of costume is minute and accurate. Paintings in oil and on glass are attributed to him, but none have been identified.

Death 
Amman died in Nuremberg, Bavaria, aged 51.

References

Kartenspiel. A pack of cards. [Leipzig, Edition Leipzig, 1967.] (A pack of cards reproduced from Amman’s Charta lusoria published in 1588, issued in case together with "Einführung von Erwin Kohlmann".)
Pictorial archive of decorative Renaissance woodcuts: (Kunstbüchl[e]in) / by Jost Amman; with an introduction by Alfred Werner. New York: Dover, [1985] c1968. 
Andresen, Andreas. Jost Amman, 1539–1591: Graphiker und Buchillustrator der Renaissance. Beschreibender Katalog seiner Holzschnitte, Radierungen und der von ihm illustrierten Bücher. Mit einer biographischen Skizze und mit Registern seines Werkes und der Autoren illustrierten Bücher. Amsterdam: G. W. Hissink [1973]. (Reprint of the 1864 ed., published by Danz, Leipzig, which was issued as part of v. 1 of the author’s Der deutsche Peintre-Graveur.) 
Becker, Carl. Jobst Amman, Zeichner und Formschneider, Kupferätzer und Stecher. Leipzig: R. Weigel, 1854.

External links 

Biography I
Biography II
Charta Lusoria 1588
Wappenbuch 1579 - Heraldic plates
Das Ständebuch – Book of Trades plates 1568 – from Wikimedia Commons
A deck of playing cards designed by Jost Amman was featured in the 2012 book The Stockholm Octavo where they were used for a fictional form of cartomancy
Panoplia omnium illiberalium mechanicarum aut sedentariarum artium. (Book of Trades) 1568 - digital facsimile from the Linda Hall Library

1539 births
1591 deaths
16th-century Swiss people
16th-century engravers
Swiss engravers
Heraldic artists